Outwood Academy Hemsworth, known previously as Hemsworth Arts and Community Academy and Hemsworth Arts and Community College, is a  mixed secondary school and sixth form located in Hemsworth in the City of Wakefield, West Yorkshire, England.

The school is operated by Outwood Grange Academies Trust, and the principal Toby Rutter.

History
The school was opened in 1921, set up by the West Riding County Council's Education Committee and known as Hemsworth Grammar School. (It is not to be confused with Archbishop Holgate's grammar school, founded in Hemsworth in 1546 which moved to Barnsley in 1888.) It was renamed Hemsworth High School when the school became comprehensive. In 2001 the school gained specialist status as an Arts College and was renamed Hemsworth Arts and Community College. The school converted to academy status in August 2013 and was renamed Hemsworth Arts and Community Academy. It was sponsored by the Wakefield City Academies Trust, a multi-academy trust.

Hemsworth Arts and Community Academy offers GCSEs and BTECs as programmes of study for pupils, while students in the sixth form have the option to study from a range of A-levels and further BTECs. The school also offers adult education courses to the local community.

On 1 May 2018 the school became part of Outwood Grange Academies Trust, reopening as Outwood Academy Hemsworth.

Notable former pupils

Hemsworth High School
 David Wainwright, cricketer
 Scott Askham, MMA fighter

Hemsworth Grammar School
 Derek Birley, educationalist and writer, Vice-Chancellor from 1984 to 1981 of the University of Ulster
 Geoffrey Boycott, legendary Yorkshire and England cricketer (batsman)
 Phil Bull, gambler and publisher, who founded Timeform in Halifax
 Jeffrey Ennis, Labour MP from 1997 to 2010 for Barnsley East and Mexborough
 Leonard Parkin, journalist at ITN in the 1970s and 1980s on the News at Ten and 5.45 News
 Peter Toon, priest and theologian

References

External links
 

Secondary schools in the City of Wakefield
Academies in the City of Wakefield
Educational institutions established in the 1540s
1547 establishments in England
Hemsworth
Hemsworth